Carlisle II  is the oldest of only two operational examples of a Puget Sound Mosquito Fleet  vessel. (The other is the 1922 Steamship Virginia V.) They were once part of a large fleet of small passenger and freight carrying ships that linked the islands and ports of Puget Sound in Washington state in the late 19th and early 20th centuries.

History
Carlisle II  was built in Bellingham in 1917 by Lummi Island Navigation Company, and first carried freight and passengers between Bellingham and the Carlisle Packing Company’s salmon cannery on Lummi Island. Original power was from a Fairbanks-Morse Type "C-O" Heavy Duty Marine Oil Engine. It was a three-cylinder hot bulb (or "semi-diesel") engine rated 75 horsepower at 340 RPM.

In 1923 she was rebuilt as a car ferry and ran from Gooseberry Point to Lummi and Orcas islands.

Horluck Transportation Co., under Captain Willis Nearhoff, purchased Carlisle II in 1936 and converted her back to passenger vessel use for the short run between Bremerton and Port Orchard across Sinclair Inlet. The service was heavily used during the war years by personnel commuting to and from the Puget Sound Naval Shipyard in Bremerton. Eventually Mr. Nearhoff's daughter, Mary Lieske, became manager and then owner of the company.  She was also reportedly the first woman ferry captain.

Seattle businessman Hilton Smith bought out Horluck in 1995 and invested almost $300,000 in repairs and upgrades to Carlisle II. In 2008, Kitsap Transit purchased Carlisle II from Smith and continues to use her as needed on the Bremerton-Port Orchard run. The vessel underwent a major, two-year renovation that cost $1.3 million and wa completed in 2021. The renovation included replacing the engine, generator, ventilation, and propeller, along with repainting of the exterior and seating areas.

Current Status

Carlisle II remains in operation, offering regularly scheduled foot passenger service between Bremerton and Port Orchard, Washington. It is planned to be replaced by the MV Waterman, a hybrid diesel-electric ferry, and relegated to backup service.

Carlisle II has been designated a "Floating Museum" by the Washington Commission for the Humanities, and her interior is decorated with numerous photos and information about her and other Mosquito Fleet vessels.

Books
 Kitsap County Historical Society, Port Orchard (Images of America),  Arcadia Publishing, 2012, page 112,  
 Follansbee, Joe, The Fyddeye Guide to America's Maritime History, Fyddeye (Publisher), 2010, page 68,  
 Neal, Carolyn, and Janus, Thomas Kilday, Puget Sound Ferries, American Historical Press, 2001, pages 59, 80

See also
Puget Sound Mosquito Fleet

References

External links

Museum ships in Washington (state)
Ferries of Washington (state)
Motor vessels of Washington (state)